The Military Police Brigade of Rio Grande do Sul (BMRS) like other military police in Brazil is a reserve and ancillary force of the Brazilian Army, and part of the System of Public Security and Brazilian Social Protection. Its members are called "State Military" person.

The primary mission of BMRS is ostensibly preventive policing for the maintenance of public order in the State of Rio Grande do Sul.

Under the United Nations, in cooperation with the Brazilian Army, the Military Police of Rio Grande do Sul has served in Guinea-Bissau and Haiti.

See also 
 Military Police of Brazil
Brazilian Federal Police
National Force of Public Safety
Federal Highway Police
Brazilian Civil Police
 Gendarmerie
 Governor of Rio Grande do Sul

References

External links 

 Official website of Military Police of Rio Grande do Sul State (in Portuguese)

Rio Grande do Sul
Rio Grande do Sul